Yeh Hai Raaz is a TV show telecast on Star Plus in 1997–1998. The show was directed by Karan Razdan, and stars Ruby Bhatia and Alyy Khan. 

Ruby Bhatia plays a policeman and Alyy Khan plays a criminal, and together they solve a new crime every week.  Ruby Bhatia was later replaced by Deepti Bhatnagar.

References 

 

StarPlus original programming
1997 Indian television series debuts
1998 Indian television series endings